Voter caging involves challenging the registration status of voters and calling into question the legality of allowing them to vote. Usually it involves sending mail directly to registered voters and compiling a list from mail returned undelivered. Undeliverable mail is seen as proof that the person no longer resides at the address on their voter registration. The resultant list is then used by election officials to purge names from the voter registration rolls or to challenge voters' eligibility to vote on the grounds that the voters no longer reside at their registered addresses.

In the United States, the practice of purging voter rolls has been challenged by the American Civil Liberties Union, Fair Fight Action, and other voting rights advocates in the courts for perceived racial bias when minority neighborhoods are targeted, and some courts have declared such purging illegal under the Voting Rights Act of 1965. However, the practice remains legal in many states, and the U.S. Supreme Court rejected a 2018 legal challenge to Ohio's list-maintenance process.

Method
Voter caging typically refers to the practice of sending mail to addresses on the voter rolls, compiling a list of the mail that is returned undelivered, and using that list to purge or challenge voters' registrations and votes on the grounds that the voters on the roll do not legally reside at their registered addresses.

Usually, a political party will send out non-forwardable, first-class mail to voters or particular voters they want to target (often assumed to be a demographic that belongs to the opposing party). It will compile a list of voters for whom mail has been returned as undeliverable. The list is called a caging list. In some cases, such mail can be returned at a rate of 1 in every 15 letters sent out, as shown in Ohio in 2008 when the Board of Elections had 600,000 letters of voter confirmation returned as undeliverable. The party uses caging lists created by themselves or by the Board of Elections to challenge the registration status of voters and potentially purge them from the voting rolls under state laws that allow voters whose registrations are suspect to be challenged.

When voters turn out to vote, they may be challenged and required to cast a provisional ballot. If investigation of the provisional ballot demonstrates that the voter has just moved or there is an error in the address and the voter is legally registered, the vote should be counted.

Voter caging is an unreliable method of determining if a voter is ineligible to vote and is usually used with partisan aims to target members of the opposing party. According to the Brennan Center, "Voter caging is closely related to other techniques that use unreliable data to draw undue conclusions concerning voters eligibility and then seek to use those conclusions to justify blunt and sweeping purges and challenges." Some reasons that voter caging is unreliable include typos in voter addresses or streets having been renamed, mail incorrectly delivered, voters not receiving mail at a particular address or refusing mail delivery, temporary addresses used by homeless persons, voter away from their residence or voters moving permanently but otherwise still eligible to vote.

United States

Legality
Section 8 of the National Voter Registration Act of 1993 (NVRA) has been interpreted to prohibit voter caging:

Voter caging may thus be legal if the primary purpose is to identify those who are not properly registered to vote and to prevent them from voting illegally but not if the primary purpose is to disenfranchise legitimately registered voters on the basis of a technicality.

In January 2018, the U.S. Supreme Court heard oral arguments in Husted v. Randolph Institute, a legal challenge to Ohio voter caging laws. The Court upheld Ohio's list-maintenance practice in a 5–4 decision issued in June 2018.

Examples

1980s 

In 1980, Republican politician Paul Weyrich said, "I don't want everybody to vote. ... our leverage in the elections ... goes up as the voting populace goes down."

In 1981 and 1986, the Republican National Committee (RNC) sent out letters to African-American neighborhoods. When tens of thousands of them were returned undeliverable, the party successfully challenged the voters and had them deleted from voting rolls. The violation of the Voting Rights Act got the RNC taken to court by the Democratic National Committee (DNC). As a result of the case, the RNC entered a consent decree, which prohibited the party from engaging in anti-fraud initiatives that targeted minorities from conducting mail campaigns to "compile voter challenge lists."

The RNC sent letters to predominantly-black neighborhoods in New Jersey in 1981. When 45,000 letters were returned as undeliverable, the committee compiled a challenge list to remove those voters from the rolls. The RNC then sent off-duty law enforcement officials to the polls and hung posters in heavily black neighborhoods warning that violating election laws is a crime.  The effect was to suppress or intimidate black voters.

In Louisiana in 1986, the RNC tried to have 31,000 voters, mostly black, removed from the rolls when a party mailer was returned. Again, the action was challenged and dismissed. The consent decrees that resulted prohibited the party from engaging in anti-fraud initiatives that target minorities or from conducting mail campaigns to "compile voter challenge lists."

2004 elections
BBC journalist Greg Palast obtained an RNC document entitled "State Implementation Template III.doc" that described Republican election operations for caging plans in numerous states. The paragraph in the document pertaining to caging was:

V. Pre Election Day Operations New Registration Mailing
At whatever point registration in the state closes, a first class mailing should be sent to all new registrants as well as purged/inactive voters. This mailing should welcome the recipient to the voter rolls. It is important that a return address is clearly identifiable. Any mail returned as undeliverable for any reason, should be used to generate a list of problematic registrations. Poll watchers should have this list and be prepared to challenge anyone from this list attempting to vote.

Shortly before the 2004 election, Palast also obtained a caging list for Jacksonville, Florida, which contained many blacks and registered Democrats. The list was attached to an email that a Florida Republican Party official was sending to RNC headquarters official Tim Griffin.

The Republican National Committee also sent letters to minority areas in Cleveland, Ohio. When 35,000 letters were returned as undeliverable, the party employed poll watchers to challenge the voters' right to vote. Civil liberties groups challenged the RNC in a case that went to the Supreme Court, but the RNC was not stopped from challenging the voters.

Similarly, the RNC sent out 130,000 letters to minority areas in mostly-black Philadelphia, Pennsylvania, and it hoped to cage voters there in the Democrat stronghold.

Journalists have found evidence that the RNC had also attempted to use voter caging to suppress or intimidate voters in states such as New Mexico, Ohio, Florida, Nevada, and Pennsylvania. For example, New Jersey RNC officials used caging lists to challenge absentee ballots and absentee ballot requests.

2008 elections
As noted earlier, the Republican Secretary of State in Michigan was found purging voters from voting rolls when voter ID cards were returned as undeliverable. In the court challenge, the federal judge ordered the state to reinstate the voters.  The judge ruled that the state's actions were in violation of the NVRA. His decision noted that there was no way to prevent qualified voters from being disfranchised as their cards may be returned as undeliverable by postal error, clerical error, inadvertent routing within a multi-unit dwelling, or even simple misspelling or transposition of numbers in an address.

In December 2007, Kansas Republican Chair Kris Kobach sent an email boasting that "to date, the Kansas GOP has identified and caged more voters in the last 11 months than the previous two years!"

Republicans sent out fundraising mailers to voters in five Florida counties: Duval, Hillsborough, Collier, Miami-Dade and Escambia, with 'do not forward' on the letters. The mailers included inaccurate voter ID numbers and ostensibly confirmed with voters they were registered as Republican. The RNC declined to discuss the mailer with the St. Petersburg Times. A representative denied that the mailing had anything to do with caging. Two top Florida elections officials, both Republicans, faulted the Republican mailing, calling it "confusing" and "unfortunate" because of a potential to undermine voter confidence by making them question the accuracy of their registrations." Some officials expressed concern that the RNC would try to use a caging list derived from the mailers.

In Northern California, reports of voter caging emerged when letters marked 'do not forward' were sent to Democrats with fake voter ID numbers. The description of the letters matched the letters that were sent out in Florida. Many details on the letters were false; for example, the letters referred to a Voter Identification Division, but RNC personnel said they had no such department. The RNC did not return calls from a news organization regarding the letters.

On October 5, 2008, the Republican Lieutenant Governor of Montana, John Bohlinger, accused the Montana Republican Party of vote caging to purge 6,000 voters from three counties that trend Democratic. The purges included decorated war veterans and active duty soldiers.

Terri Lynn Land, the Secretary of State of Michigan, was found to be purging thousands of voters from voting rolls based on Voter ID cards being returned as undeliverable. The American Civil Liberties Union (ACLU) took Michigan to court over the purges.  Judge Stephen J. Murphy ruled the purge illegal under the National Voter Registration Act of 1993 and directed Land to reinstate the affected voters.

The New York Times found in its review of state records that unlawful actions in six states led to widespread voter purges, which could have impacted the 2008 elections. Some of the actions were apparently the result of mistakes by the states in handling voter registrations and files as they tried to comply with a 2002 federal law related to running elections. Neither party was singled out, but because the Democratic Party registered more new voters this year, Democratic voters were more adversely affected by such actions of state officials.

2013: RNC v. DNC retention of consent decree
In the years since the original 1982 consent decree on voter caging, a series of suits and countersuits between the RNC and the DNC as well as civil rights groups and labor unions ensued. The RNC would attempt to have the consent decree lifted and other parties would attempt to have the decree enforced in specific cases in which the plaintiffs would allege the RNC was in violation of the decree. In November 2008, the RNC sought to have the consent decree lifted in the U.S. District Court in Newark (Republican National Committee v. Democratic National Committee). Judge Dickinson R. Debevoise rejected the effort, and his ruling was upheld by the Third US Circuit Court of Appeals. The Third Circuit ruling found, "It is not in the public interest to vacate the decree." It also stated, "If the RNC does not hope to engage in conduct that would violate the Decree, it is puzzling that the RNC is pursuing vacatur so vigorously notwithstanding the District Court's significant modifications to the Decree." The RNC then petitioned the Supreme Court of the United States to hear an appeal of the Third Circuit ruling but the Supreme Court declined to hear the case, leaving the Third Circuit ruling to stand as legally binding.

2016: No new violation established 

"On October 26, 2016, the DNC filed a motion asking that the court find the RNC had violated the decree. On November 5, after abbreviated discovery, the district court denied the DNC’s request, ruling that the DNC had not provided sufficient evidence of coordination between the Trump campaign and the RNC on ballot-security operations, but will allow the DNC to offer further evidence after the election," according to the Brennan Center for Justice at New York University School of Law.

2016: Indiana voter purges

In 2016, Indiana came under lawsuit for using software to purge voters that was described as "99% inaccurate".

2017:  Consent decree expired 

On January 8, 2018, the US District Court for the District of New Jersey refused to extend the consent decree beyond its previous December 1, 2017, expiration date, because, “the DNC did not prove, by a preponderance of the evidence, a violation of the [1982] Consent Decree before December 1, 2017”.  Harvard Law Professor Nicholas Stephanopoulos suggested this decision was at least partially influenced by a general decline in the willingness of courts to intervene in election law issues, as witnessed by several moderately recent decisions by the Supreme Court of the United States, especially in Shelby County v. Holder.  He wrote, “the half-century in which federal courts have decided redistricting cases can be divided into two periods: one lasting from the 1960s to the 1980s, in which voters and politicians were both comparatively nonpartisan; and another reaching from the 1990s to the present day, which amounts to perhaps the most hyperpartisan era in our country’s history.”

See also
 Voter suppression in the United States

References

Further reading

External links
 NOW on PBS video report on Voter Caging, featuring an interview with Greg Palast
 BBC Newsnight report: New Florida vote scandal feared
 Republican response to Florida vote story
 Newsnight response to Republican complaint
 African-American Soldiers Scrubbed by Secret GOP Hit List
 GOP Challenging Voter Registrations
 BBC Newsnight Report Oct 2004, The Florida caging list scam
 Greg Palast discusses his 500 "lost" Rove emails proving illegal caging by Republicans
 . (includes info on voter suppression in the US state of Georgia)

Political terminology
Elections
Dismissal of U.S. attorneys controversy
Voter suppression
Electoral fraud